Dębowa Góra may refer to the following places in Poland:
Dębowa Góra, Lower Silesian Voivodeship (south-west Poland)
Dębowa Góra, Kutno County in Łódź Voivodeship (central Poland)
Dębowa Góra, Piotrków County in Łódź Voivodeship (central Poland)
Dębowa Góra, Skierniewice County in Łódź Voivodeship (central Poland)
Dębowa Góra, Silesian Voivodeship (south Poland)
Dębowa Góra, Pomeranian Voivodeship (north Poland)
Dębowa Góra, Warmian-Masurian Voivodeship (north Poland)